Nationality words link to articles with information on the nation's poetry or literature (for instance, Irish or France).

Events

Works

Great Britain
 William Basse, Three Pastoral Elegies
 Francis Beaumont, Salamacis and Hermaphroditus, published anonymously; a translation from Ovid's Metamorphoses
 John Beaumont, 
 Nicholas Breton:
 The Mother's Blessing
 Olde Mad-Cappes New Gally-Mawfrey
 
 A True Description of Unthankfulnesse; or, An Enemie to Ingratitude
 Thomas Campion's Observations in the Art of English Poesie (in response, Samuel Daniel published Defence of Ryme 1603); London: by Richard Field for Andrew Wise; criticism
 John Davies, Mirum in Modum
 Francis and Walter Davison, editors, A Poetical Rhapsody
 Thomas Deloney, Strange Histories of Kings, Princes, Dukes, Earles, Lords, Ladies, Knights, and Gentlemen, published anonymously, with music
 Samuel Rowlands, 'Tis Merrie When Gossips Meete (has been attributed to Robert Greene, and part of it is plagaiarized from him)
 Robert Southwell, St. Peter's Complaint, with Other Poems
 William Warner, Albions England, fifth edition, in 13 books, with Epitome

Other
 Jean Bertaut, Recueil de quelques vers amoureux,("Collection of Some Amorous Verse"), France
 Giambattista Marino, Le Rime, Italy
 Jean Passerat, Le premier livre des poèmes. Reueus & augmentez par l'autheur en ceste derniere édition, à Paris
 Lope de Vega, La hermosura de Angélica ("The Beauty of Angelica"), Spain
 Cristóbal de Virués, El Monserrate segundo Spain

Births
 January 24 – Mildmay Fane, 2nd Earl of Westmorland (died 1666), English nobleman, politician and writer
 Also:
 Giacomo Badoaro (died 1654), Venetian nobleman and poet
 Owen Feltham (died 1668), English essayist and poet
 Juan Pérez de Montalbán (died 1638), Spanish dramatist, poet and novelist
 Claude de L'Estoile (died 1652), French playwright and poet
 Pierre Le Moyne (died 1671), French Jesuit poet
 William Strode (died 1645), English poet

Deaths
 April 3 – Siôn Tudur (born 1522), Welsh language poet
 August 29 – Sebastian Klonowic (born  1545), Polish poet and composer
 September 14 – Jean Passerat (born 1534), French political satirist and poet
 October 30 – Jean-Jacques Boissard (born 1528), French antiquary and Latin poet
 Also:
 Martín del Barco Centenera (born 1535), Spanish cleric, explorer, author and poet
 Bartholomew Griffin (born unknown), English poet
 Hans Wilhelm Kirchhof (born 1525), German Landsknecht, baroque poet and translator

See also
 16th century in literature
 Dutch Renaissance and Golden Age literature
 Elizabethan literature
 English Madrigal School
 French Renaissance literature
 Renaissance literature
 Spanish Renaissance literature
 University Wits

Notes

17th-century poetry
Poetry